The following is a list of national constitutions by country, semi-recognized countries, and by codification.

Codified constitutions (most recent, in use today) 
A codified constitution is a constitution that is contained in a single document, which is the single source of constitutional law in a state. An uncodified constitution is one that is not contained in a single document, but consists of several different sources, which may be written or unwritten.

Sovereign states (UN member and observer states)

Unrecognized and partially recognized countries

Dependent territories

Uncodified constitutions 
An uncodified constitution is one where not all elements are written into law. Typically some elements, such as constitutional conventions, are not written into law. Such elements are almost always written down somewhere (perhaps across multiple documents and/or publications), however written in documents that are not enforceable in law. Approximate dates have been listed below based on fundamental founding documents on governance of the respective countries.

 Constitution of Canada (1867)
 Basic Laws of Israel (1950)
 Constitution of New Zealand (1840)
 Constitution of San Marino (1600)
 Basic Laws of Sweden (1810)
 Constitution of the United Kingdom (1215)

Former constitutions 
Afghanistan
Constitution of the Kingdom of Afghanistan (1964)
Constitution of the Islamic Republic of Afghanistan (2004)
Bulgaria

 Constitution of the Principality of Bulgaria (1879)
 Constitution of the People’s Republic of Bulgaria (1947)
 Constitution of the People’s Republic of Bulgaria (1971)

China 
Constitution of the Qing Empire 1908
Constitution of the Republic of China (1912) 
Constitution of the Republic of China (1947) — Suspended 1948, amended 1991
Temporary Provisions against the Communist Rebellion
The Common Program (1949)
Constitution of the People's Republic of China (1954)
Constitution of the People's Republic of China (1975)
Constitution of the People's Republic of China (1978)
Cuba

 Constitution of Cuba (1901)
 Constitution of Cuba (1940)
 Constitution of Cuba (1976)

Czechoslavakia
Constitution of Czechoslovakia (1920)
Constitution of Czechoslovakia (1948)
Constitution of Czechoslovakia (1960)
Constitution of Czechoslovakia (1968)
Egypt

 Constitution of Egypt (1879) (abortive)
 Fundamental Ordinance (1882)
 Constitution of Egypt (1923)
 Constitution of Egypt (1930)

 Provisional constitution of 1953
 Constitution of Egypt (1956)
 Provisional Constitution of the United Arab Republic (1958)
 Constitutional Proclamation (1962)
 Constitution of United Arab Republic (1964)
 Constitution of the Arab Republic of Egypt (1971)
 Provisional Constitution of the Arab Republic of Egypt  (2011)
 Constitution of Egypt (2012)

France
Constitution of the Kingdom of France (1791)
Constitution of the First French Republic (1793)
Constitution of the First French Republic (1795)
Constitution of the First French Republic (1799)
Constitution of the First French Republic (1801)
Constitution of the First French Empire (1804)
Constitution of the Kingdom of France (1814)
Constitution of the First French Empire (1815)
Constitution of the Kingdom of France (1830)
Constitution of the Second French Republic
Constitution of the Second French Empire
Constitution of the Third French Republic
Constitution of the French State (Vichy Regime)
Constitution of the Fourth French Republic
Germany
 Constitution of the German Confederation (1815)
 Constitution of Prussia (1848)
 Frankfurt Constitution (1849)
 Constitution of Prussia (1850)
 North German Constitution (1867)
 Constitution of the German Confederation (1871)
 Constitution of the German Empire (1871)
 Weimar Constitution (1919)
 Constitution of Prussia (1920)
 Reichstag Fire Decree (1933)
 Enabling Act (1933)
 First Constitution of East Germany (1949)
 Second Constitution of East Germany (1968)
Hawaii
Constitution of the Kingdom of Hawaii (1840)
Constitution of the Kingdom of Hawaii (1852)
Constitution of the Kingdom of Hawaii (1864)
Constitution of the Kingdom of Hawaii (1887)
Constitution of the Republic of Hawaii
Italy

 Corsican Constitution
 Constitution of the Cisalpine Republic (1797)
Constitution of the Cisalpine Republic (1798)
Constitution of the Cisalpine Republic (1801)
Constitution of the Napoleonic Italian Republic
Constitution of the Napoleonic Italian Kingdom
Statuto Albertino
Poland

 Constitution of the Duchy of Warsaw (1807)
 Constitution of the Kingdom of Poland (1815)
 Organic Statute of the Kingdom of Poland (1832)

Russia
Constitution of the Russian Empire
Constitution of the Russian Republic
Constitution of the Russian Soviet Federative Socialist Republic (1918)
Constitution of the Russian Soviet Federative Socialist Republic (1978)
Constitution of the Soviet Union (1924)
Constitution of the Soviet Union (1936)
Constitution of the Soviet Union (1977)
Yugoslavia
Constitution of the Kingdom of Yugoslavia (1921)
Constitution of the Kingdom of Yugoslavia (1931)
Constitution of Yugoslavia (1946)
Constitution of Yugoslavia (1963)
Constitution of Yugoslavia (1974)
Constitution of Yugoslavia (1992)
Constitutional Charter of Serbia and Montenegro
Other States

Constitution of the Irish Free State
Constitution of Japan (1889)
Constitution of Poland-Lithuania 
Constitution of the Kingdom of Poland
Constitution of the Principality of Serbia (1835)
Constitution of Persia
Constitution of the Confederate States
Ottoman constitution of 1876
Constitution of Ukraine (1710)
Constitution of Vermont Republic
Constitution of the Republic of Texas

See also 
 Constitution Day
 Constitutional documents
 Constitutional law
 State constitution (United States)

References 

 List
Constitutions
National constitutions